Llewelyn Lloyd may refer to:

Llewelyn Lloyd (painter) (1879–1949), Italian-born British-Italian Divisionist painter
Llewelyn Lloyd (naturalist) (1792–1876), British writer in Sweden

See also
Lloyd Llewellyn, a comic book by Daniel Clowes